Magheraconluce (historically Magheraclonelish - ) is a small village and townland near Annahilt in County Down, Northern Ireland. In the 2001 Census it had a population of 282 people. It is within the Lisburn City Council area.

References 

NI Neighbourhood Information System

Villages in County Down
Townlands of County Down
Civil parish of Annahilt